The Deposition or Lamentation over the Dead Christ is a painting by the Flemish artist Anthony van Dyck. Dating to 1635, it is one of his final treatments of the subject. It was commissioned by Cesare Alessandro Scaglia, who intended it to hang over his tomb in the Recollects Convent in Antwerp. It is now in the Royal Museum of Fine Arts Antwerp.

References

1635 paintings
Religious paintings by Anthony van Dyck
Paintings of the Descent from the Cross
Paintings of the Virgin Mary